The S.O.S. Band (sometimes written as S.O.S. Band; abbreviation for Sounds of Success) is an American R&B and electro-funk group who gained fame in the 1980s. They are best known for the songs "Take Your Time (Do It Right)", "Just Be Good to Me", and "The Finest".

History
The Atlanta, Georgia, band was started in 1977, when keyboardist / vocalist Jason Bryant, saxophonists Billy Ellis and Willie "Sonny" Killebrew, guitarist Bruno Speight, bassist John Alexander Simpson, drummer James Earl Jones III, and lead vocalist Mary Davis formed a group called Sounds of Santa Monica that played at Atlanta nightclub the Regal Room.

Their manager (Bunny Jackson-Ransom) sent a demo to Clarence Avant, head of Tabu Records. After signing the band to Tabu, Avant suggested that the band work with songwriter/producer Sigidi Abdullah. Abdullah was curious as to why an Atlanta-based band named itself Santa Monica. Keyboardist Jason Bryant replied that the band had an enjoyable concert in Santa Monica, California. Abdullah then came up with a new band name, The S.O.S. Band, with S.O.S. standing for "Sounds of Success".

Abdullah produced and co-wrote "Take Your Time (Do It Right)" – which went platinum – with Harold Clayton, the song parking at number one R&B for five weeks and peaking at number three pop on Billboard's charts in spring 1980. Their eponymous debut album, S.O.S., went gold, selling over 800,000 copies and holding the number two R&B spot for three weeks. While the band was on its world tour, trumpeter/vocalist/percussionist Abdul Ra'oof joined them. Their second album, Too, went to number 30 R&B in the summer of 1981.

On the band's third album, III, they worked with producer Leon Sylvers III and writers Jimmy Jam and Terry Lewis. Their breaking single, "High Hopes", hit number 25 R&B in the fall of 1982 while the album went to number 27 R&B in late 1982.

Jam and Lewis took over the production duties on their fourth album, On the Rise, scoring with the number two hit "Just Be Good to Me" (A song that would later be featured as the theme to Richard Pryor's stand-up film, "Here and Now", and again in Grand Theft Auto IV's in-game radio, The Vibe 98.8) and the number five ballad "Tell Me If You Still Care". On the Rise became their second gold album, hitting number seven R&B in the summer of 1983.

The formula continued to work: Just the Way You Like It (including the number six R&B single "Just the Way You Like It") went to number six R&B in the fall of 1984 and Sands of Time (including the number two R&B hit "The Finest") went gold and hit number four R&B in the spring of 1986. Many of these releases, as well as the sound of early releases, helped to popularize the now-classic sound of the TR-808 Roland drum machine.

In late 1986, vocalist Mary Davis left the S.O.S. Band to pursue a solo career. In 1987, the band contributed a song called "It's Time to Move" to the Police Academy 4: Citizens on Patrol soundtrack. The band released their seventh album in 1989. For Diamonds in the Raw the lead vocalists were Chandra Currelley and Fredi Grace, and three producers were used (Curtis Williams, Eban Kelly & Jimi Randolph, Jason Bryant, and Sigidi). Saxophonist Billy Ellis, also one of the founder members, died during the recording of Diamonds in the Raw. The album reached number 43 on the R&B chart.

One of Many Nights, with lead vocalist Chandra Currelley and produced by Curtis Williams, followed in 1991. It failed to chart. Davis subsequently rejoined the band, performing on tours.

In 2021 Mary Davis retired from performing after suffering a stroke.

Discography
All albums and singles listed below were issued on Tabu Records.

Studio albums

Compilation albums

Singles

See also
List of number-one dance hits (United States)
List of artists who reached number one on the US Dance chart

References

External links

S.O.S. Band performing "Take Your Time (Do It Right)"' on Soul Train in 1980.

 
African-American musical groups
American boogie musicians
American dance music groups
American disco groups
American funk musical groups
American soul musical groups
Musical groups established in 1977
Musical groups from Atlanta
Musical groups from Georgia (U.S. state)